Romero Games Ltd. is an independent video game development studio that was established on 11 August 2015 by husband-and-wife team John Romero and Brenda Romero and is located in Galway, Ireland. This is the ninth game studio Romero has established in his career, and currently it has released four titles.

History

Following his departure from Ion Storm in July 2001, John Romero worked to establish Monkeystone Games in 2001 with Tom Hall before departing to help establish Gazillion Entertainment in 2005. John Romero and Brenda Romero married on 27 October 2012. Together, they worked on Ravenwood Fair, with John Romero as Lead Designer and Brenda as Creative Director and Game Designer. They also founded social game development company Loot Drop in November 2010, and worked on Cloudforest Expedition and Ghost Recon Commander together. They moved to Ireland and together they established Romero Games Ltd. on 11 August 2015.

The studio's first game was an HD, re-skinned Dangerous Dave in the Deserted Pirate's Hideout which added new graphics and music to the classic platformer that he had designed and released in 1990, but was released on mobile. The studio's second game, Gunman Taco Truck, was released on 28 January 2017 on Steam (Windows and Mac) and for iPhone and Android devices.

Night Work Games, a subsidiary of Romero Games, has been developing a first-person shooter titled Blackroom since 2016. In an interview on November 23, 2019, Romero claimed he was still working on Blackroom.

The studio announced in March 2017 that several prominent indie game developers had joined the team at Romero Games to work on a new title that has not yet been announced. Empire of Sin, a role-playing game set in the Prohibition era, was revealed at E3 2019. The game was released on 1 December 2020 to "mixed or average reviews" from critics, according to review aggregator Metacritic.

On July 19, 2022, Romero Games announced that they are starting work on an original, new AAA FPS IP with Unreal Engine 5.

Games

References

External links 

Night Work Games (archived)

Galway (city)
Video game development companies
Video game publishers
Video game companies established in 2015
Video game companies of Ireland
Irish companies established in 2015